Paltan is a thana (precinct) of Dhaka, the capital of Bangladesh.
It is often said to be the center of Dhaka, dividing "Old Dhaka" and "New Dhaka". Paltan was made a thana in 2005 by then Prime Minister Begum Khaleda Zia. Paltan Thana was formed on 27 June 2005 comprising part of Motijheel thana.

History

The name Paltan came from a cantonment of the British East India Company. The name was derived from the English word platoon, but in reality a size of  battalion or regiment. Starting from Gulistan area, Purana Paltan, Purana Paltan Lane, Naya Paltan, Topkhana and up to Fulbaria rail-line, it was the cantonment of the East India Company and there were Artillery forces in Topkhana. 'Top' means cannon and Topkhana means armoury. It is a Turkish word. In the year 1840 the cantonment was transferred to Ramna, Begunbari, then to Lalbagh Fort. After the First war of Indian Independence (sepoy mutiny according to the British Raj) in 1857 the Cantonment was shifted to Mill Barrack. After the transfer of the cantonment the area was given to the municipality to be taken care of. From the whole area they took a part and made a garden which was known as ”Company Bagicha”. There was a big field in the rest part, which was used by the student of Dhaka College as their playground. Beside this it was used as the Parade Ground  of Lt. Governor. But end of the 19th century it was used as the cricket field and sometimes the public meetings took place over here.

Up to 1930, very few people lived in Paltan. Buddhadeva Bose's novella 'Moner Moto Meye' is evocative of this period; the character Bikash says “When I was 17 years old I came to a house in Paltan. At that time there were only three houses in that area”.

Paltan has boasted numerous noted personalities and families since its beginning. The Gazis, Abedins, Chowdhurys and Roufs were among the families who settled during the early 19th century. These families played a major role in development of the city as a whole.

Geography
Its total area is 1.42 km2.

Administration
Paltan has 02 Wards(Wards-36, 56), 13 Mahallas and 01 Police Station. etc.

Features

VIP Road- In Paltan area there is an inner-circular VIP road (now named as Anjuman-e- Mufidul Islam road, Shahid-Manik road), which is 120 feet wide divided by a divider. The road is named so because it's the pathway for all VIP's starting from the Prime minister and President of the country to most business tycoons.
This road is Adjacent to Motijheel, the countries business capital area which includes principal branches of nearly all the banks and other financial organizations along with the corporate offices of most of the companies. The stock Exchange of Dhaka is also located at the same area.

Police Station-The model police station “Paltan Thana” is located in Paltan. People can obtain help from police at any time. There is a big police quarter inside the police station. Around 200 police force stays here, including female police.

Shopping Complexes- Paltan, being one of the oldest areas in the city, boasts numerous shopping centers and markets. Baitul Mukarram, Polwel super Market, Paltan Super Market, City heart, Gazi Bhaban and many other centers are situated in the area.

Hotel and Restaurants- Many hotels are there in Paltan most of which strictly maintain international standards and outlook while serving a huge group Foreign investors, sports and other club members and visitors as well. Amongst them Hotel Victory, Orchard, Razmoni Isha Khan, Grand Azad are worth mentioning.
Restaurants like Midnight Sun-3, Sizzler, Lan Hua, Mouri and numerous others are satisfying the desire of the epicures of the city since long.

Automobile Market- The area boasts of the largest automobile market of Bangladesh as well numerous motor vehicle workshops which are operating since long with their identical goodwill.

Cinema Halls and Community Centers- The renowned cinema halls Razmoni and Jonaki are located in this area. Ananda Bhaban and Paltan Community Center in this area are well known community centers in the city.

Masjids and other places of worship- Dhaka is known as the city of Masjids. Numerous masjids are located in this area. ‘Baitul Mukarram’, the national masjid, is located in this Zone. Naya Paltan Jame masjid, Purana Paltan masjid, Purana Paltan Lane Bot-tola masjid are amongst others to be mentioned. Most of these masjids were built during the earlier decades of the last century.
The Archbishop house known as the Kakrail Church which is one of the oldest and biggest church in the city is located near Paltan.

Siddheshwari Kali Mandir, one of the major sacred places for the Hindus is also situated near this area apart from many others.

Notable residents
Starting from the British period till today numerous noted individuals have lived in the greater Paltan. Amongst them Great Political and social reformer; Philanthropist Alhajj Abdul Halim Chowdhury, Noted Industrialist Mr. Nurunnabi Gazi, Printing and Packaging pioneer Mr. Mohammed Hussain, Aga Khani industrialist Mr. Mohammad Bhai, Veteran Politician Gazi Golam Mostafa, Central Commerce Minister of Pakistan Mr. Wahiduzzaman, Lawyer Adv. Ashraf Ali Chowdhury, Adv Golam Morshed, Pakistan's Hilal-i-Quaid, first editor of Dawn (newspaper) and Central Industry Minister of Pakistan back in 1965 Altaf Husain's brother Censor Board Chairman Anwar Husain and his wife Media personality and daughter of renowned  Bollywood Actor Pahari Sanyal – Namita Anwar, One of the most famous painter of the subcontinent Shilpacharya Zainul Abedin, Renowned left politician/columnist/veteran journalist of Bangladesh Nirmal Sen, journalist Ataur Rahman, veteran singers Md. Khurshid Alam, Shahnaz Rahmatullah, Abeda Sultana, Shimul Billah, Music director Anwar Parvez, Actor Raisul Islam Asad, Late Zafar Iqbal, pioneer businessman Faiz Ahmed of Faiz Cold Storage Limited, famous cultural organizer and freedom fighter Nasiruddin Yousuf Bacchu, Photo and Cinematographer Mr. Shafiqul Islam Swapan, Cricket commentator Shamim Ashraf Chowdhury, famous Bharat Natyam specialist artist Shukla Sarker and many more are to be mentioned. Most of the political and social figures of the last century also were directly related to this area during their lifetime.

The area has, starting from small daily need markets to international stadiums. This zone has witnessed and influenced most of the political as well social happening of this country as a whole since long, be it British period, Pakistan period or post war period as well now. Though it gradually is affected due to population and habitation problems alike other areas of the city it still stands apart in the city.

Naya Paltan
There is a history of the naming of Naya Paltan. Before the 1950s this area presently named as Naya Paltan was called Ramkrishnapur. There were hardly 25 families residing in the two lanes of the area. One lane is through to Purana Paltan. The other lane was blind having less than 10 families. In 1952 (year of Language Movement of 1952) the residents (Including  Dr. Abdul Halim, Md. Rajab Ali, Md. Zohad Hossain, and others) of the area (Then Ramkrishnapur) sat together in several occasions to change the name of the area. The reason was, after partition of 1947 all the original owners of the area sold their houses and migrated to India and new owners populated and developed the area. The first proposal was to change the name from Ramkrishnapur to Allahrasulpur. In subsequent meetings this proposal did not get sufficient support. The second proposal was Naya Paltan. Immediately, this proposal was seconded and supported by all.

The most respected person of the blind lane was Professor Dr. Abdul Halim. Originally the lane was six feet wide. One fine morning in the year of 1953/54 Dr. Halim sat together with the local land lords and took a resolution to widen the lane from 6 feet to 18 feet. In the next day he grounded all his five giant trees along his property line and released 6 feet of his side. Then all other land lords followed him. That is how the lane of Naya Paltan came into existence. At that time 18 feet wide lane was simply a dream.

Notable of the old residents after the partition of India at that period were:

Alhajj Abdul Halim Chowdhury (Councillor of the then Municipality)

Mr. Hasan Ali Sheth

Mr. K.B.M.A Rashid

Engineer Golam Mohammad

Engineer Zahurul Haque

Engineer Abdul Halim

Engineer Moslehuddin

Engineer Mortuza Ali of Engineers Court

Dr. Joynal Abedin

M.A. Shikdar

Mr. M.A. Samad

Nurun Nabi Gazi

Moulvi Idris Chowdhury

Mr shamsud zoha foiyaz

Mr. abul kashem

Mr. Ansar Ali

Mr. Helal Uddin

Mr. Fazlul Haque

Mr. Khandakar Mohiuddin

Mr. Syed Abdul Majid

Mr. Shamsher Ali Khan

Mr. Muzaffar Hussain

Mr. Abdul Wase Chowdhury

Mr. Haris Ur Rahman Chowdhury

Mr. Gazi Harun Ur Rashid

Mr. Munshi Shakhawat and few more.

Purana Paltan

Under British rule, the Government maintained a regiment of soldiers here and hence it got the name Purana Paltan. In this spot the Army had a firing range. During 1956 there were fewer buildings in Purana Paltan and it was surrounded by villages on the east and north, and a vast empty space to the south. Now there's hardly any open place. This is an old Dhaka Landmark. At present it is famous for publishing houses. Recently it got popularity for large number of travel agency being shifted to Purana Paltan.

References

External links 
 Paltan Area Map
 National Mosque of Bangladesh

Populated places in Dhaka Division
Thanas of Dhaka